The North Jersey Coast Line is a commuter rail line running from Rahway to Bay Head, New Jersey, traversing through the Jersey Shore region. Operated by New Jersey Transit, the line is electrified as far south as Long Branch. On rail system maps it is colored light blue, and its symbol is a sailboat. The line runs along the former New York & Long Branch Railroad, which was co-owned by the Central Railroad of New Jersey and the Pennsylvania Railroad.

Most trains operate between New York Penn Station and Long Branch, with frequent rush-hour service and hourly local off-peak service. Diesel shuttle trains between Long Branch and Bay Head meet these electric trains, although a limited number of through trains operate during weekday rush hours between Bay Head and Pennsylvania Station, utilizing dual-mode engines. Hourly New York to Long Branch service operates on weekends, with bi-hourly diesel shuttle service (with some extra trains) between Long Branch and Bay Head. Full hourly service operates during the peak summer season. Some electric trains terminate at South Amboy and make all stops from New York Penn Station, providing local service for the Northeast Corridor stops of Rahway, Linden, Elizabeth, and North Elizabeth during rush hours.

Service

The line is double track, except for the bridge over the Manasquan River at Brielle. The line has cab signals and wayside block signals; the line from Rahway to Long Branch is signaled for operation in either direction on both tracks (NORAC Rule 261). Twelve interlockings facilitate flexibility in operation between the two tracks; these and other interlockings control movements to or from freight lines such as the Chemical Coast Secondary, the Amboy Secondary, and the Southern Secondary, as well as Long Branch Yard.

Passenger yards are at Long Branch and Bay Head. Long Branch Yard is fully electrified, and mostly interlocked. Bay Head contains a large balloon (circular looping) track where entire trains can reverse direction without backing up or uncoupling the locomotive, and obviating the need for a turntable. It remains in service, even though push-pull operation has eliminated the need for turning of trains. Bay Head Yard has no interlocking; all switches are hand-operated. A yard and sidings formerly existed at South Amboy, dating to when electrification ended there, but have since been removed; trains terminating at South Amboy cannot be bypassed by using the other track, as the new station has a single island platform.

Conrail Shared Assets Operations also operates over the North Jersey Coast Line to interchange with the Delaware and Raritan River Railroad in Red Bank.

Movable bridges

The North Jersey Coast Line has five movable bridges of the twelve used by the NJT rail network, the most on any one line.
 River Draw (swing) at Raritan Bay
 Morgan Draw (bascule) spans cross the Cheesequake or Morgan Creek
 Oceanport Draw (swing, with non-movable catenary) over the Shrewsbury River 
 the Shark River Draw (bascule) on Shark River
 Brielle Draw over the Manasquan River
All these bridges were originally double-track spans, but Brielle Draw has been single-tracked since the mid-1970s. The line also crosses over several other waterways on fixed bridges, the longest of which is over the Navesink River at Red Bank.

Electrification

The North Jersey Coast Line is electrified north (railroad east) of Long Branch.

Electrified operation between Rahway and South Amboy began about 1936. Electrification was extended to Matawan in 1982 (now called Aberdeen-Matawan), with catenary installed in the early 1980s. This was originally 11 kV, increased to 12 kV in 1978 along with Amtrak's New York-Washington electrification, with insulators capable of supporting 25 kV. Electrification at 12.5 kV 60 Hz was extended to Long Branch in 1988, with catenary installed in 1986–88. As on the 1982 extension, the insulators can handle 25 kV. The catenary is self-adjusting (constant tensioning) with ambient temperature. In 2002, the voltage from Matawan to Long Branch was changed from 12.5 kV to 25 kV. As a result, the Arrow III passenger cars can no longer run between those two points, since those trains can not run on two different voltages on one trip (the transformer voltage taps must be manually changed from alongside the MU).

The line remains electrified at 12 kV 25 Hz AC north of Matawan. Three phase breaks segregate the different power sources, at the Morgan Creek Drawbridge, Laurel (Hazlet/Holmdel), and east of Bergen Place in Red Bank.

History
With the completion of the Waterfront Connection in 1991, five weekday round trip diesel trains began running from Bay Head to Hoboken Terminal using the Waterfront Connection. On May 18, 2015, NJ Transit expanded service to include three inbound and three outbound weekday trains running from Bay Head directly to and from New York Penn Station.

Commuter Clubs

The line was home to the last remaining private commuter passenger club in the United States. The Jersey Shore Commuters Club was established in 1933 under the auspices of the Pennsylvania Railroad.  It used half of a Comet IIM car - car 5459 (built as Comet IIB 5759 in 1988). In 2004, the Comet II Club Car went through a custom overhaul by Alstom and was furnished, with the club's funding, to include reclining lounge chairs, spacious seating, at-seat fold down tables, and private conference tables. The club also hosted various onboard activities to preserve its heritage. Club members enjoyed guaranteed and spacious seating as part of their annual membership fee that the Club remitted to New Jersey Transit as part of its lease agreement. Membership was "open" and on a "first come first served basis" to those willing to pay the membership fee and abide by the club's bylaws. The Club end of the car was furnished similar to Amtrak's Amfleet and Horizon fleet of cars. The Club Car seats were actually former Amfleet Metroliner seats that the club had re-conditioned. The Club Car only ran during peak rush hour periods with one weekday round trip per day and was always run with the club end coupled to the locomotive when used.  Due to damage sustained to the Club Car in Hurricane Sandy, the commuter club was disbanded in August 2013.  Per posts on the club's Facebook page, the Club Car took its last trip on the line in October 2012, just prior to the hurricane.

Bergen Shore Express
In the summers of 1986–1988, NJ Transit experimented with service from selected stops of the Bergen County Line, around the southwest curve of the West End Junction in Jersey City, and switching from the Morris & Essex to the Northeast Corridor via a complicated set of switch maneuvers in the Newark area, then continuing express to the Coast Line, with no intermediate stops between Harmon Cove station and Long Branch station. Tickets were for a specified town and included bus service to the beach and beach admission passes.  One round trip was made each Saturday and Sunday during July. Despite high demand (on sunny days), the service was discontinued, ostensibly due to crew and equipment shortages, and the inability to forecast demand.

Summer Shore Express

In June 2014, NJ Transit began running one-seat limited-stop summer shore express trains to and from Bay Head and New York on weekends and holidays. This limited time service only ran through the summer and ended on September 1, 2014. This service was brought back for the 2015, 2016, and 2017 summer seasons. Service consisted of four inbound and outbound trips, with two trips during the morning, and two in the evening in both directions.

Hurricane Sandy

As a line paralleling the New Jersey coastline, the North Jersey Coast Line received exceptionally severe damage from Hurricane Sandy on October 29–30, 2012. Track was washed out in several places from Perth Amboy southward, most notably between South Amboy and Aberdeen-Matawan stations, where the line runs closest to the Atlantic Ocean. The Raritan Bay and Morgan Creek drawbridges were struck by boats, storage containers and other floating debris, knocking the bridges' tracks out of alignment. Trees also fell over parts of the line.  Service remained suspended for three weeks; a resumption of service only as far as Woodbridge (and skipping Avenel) on November 4 was halted after only one day due to severe overcrowding. The Christie administration announced that most North Jersey Coast Line trains would return to service on Monday, November 19, with slightly longer trip times and omission of trains to Hoboken Terminal.

Rolling stock

The Coast Line has among the most diverse selection of fleet in the NJT system.
 Long Branch trains to and from New York use ALP-45DP or ALP-46 locomotives with Comet series or Multi-Level coaches.
All service south of Long Branch is diesel, generally utilizing Alstom PL42AC, or Bombardier ALP-45DP locomotives with 4 to 6 car sets of Comet series or Multilevel coaches. Usually, passengers are required to transfer at Long Branch for service to Bay Head. After the May 18, 2015 service adjustment incorporating "One Seat Rides" between Bay Head and Penn Station in New York. "One Seat Ride" service utilizes ALP-45DP locomotives with an 8-car set of Comet series or Multi-Level coaches.
In June 2014, NJ Transit added ALP-45DP locomotives to incorporate limited-stop summer shore express "One Seat Ride" trains to and from Bay Head and Penn Station in New York on weekend and holidays only. This limited-time service only ran through the summer and ended on September 1, 2014. Based on ridership for the summer service, NJT had proposed the implementation of a possible year-round "One Seat Ride" service the following year. ALP-45DP locomotives remained in service on Bay Head to Long Branch Shuttle trains after the "One Seat Ride Service" ended. On May 18, 2015, year-round "One Seat Ride" weekday rush-hour service was implemented with three AM peak period inbound trains to Penn Station in New York, and three PM peak period outbound trains to Bay Head.

Stations

See also
New York and Long Branch Railroad
Perth Amboy and Woodbridge Railroad
Union Tower
Essay Tower

Bibliography

References

External links

 North Jersey Coast Timetable

 
NJ Transit Rail Operations
Transportation in Union County, New Jersey
Transportation in Middlesex County, New Jersey
Transportation in Monmouth County, New Jersey
Transportation in Ocean County, New Jersey